Chrysochir aureus, commonly known as Reeve's croaker, is native to the Indian and Pacific Oceans, where it inhabits coastal waters around southern India and south China.

References

Fish of India
Fish of China
Fish described in 1846
Fish of the Indian Ocean
Sciaenidae